The Boston Medical Group is a network of medical offices sharing research information and treatment methods for erectile dysfunction and premature ejaculation.  
The company opened its first office in Mexico in Guadalajara, Jalisco on 4 July 1997. Currently, Boston Medical Group has twenty-one office locations across the United States in states including California, Texas, Washington, Michigan, New York, Colorado and Florida as well as over half a dozen additional offices in several other countries, including Mexico, Argentina, Brazil, Colombia, Peru and Spain.

Treatment for Erectile Dysfunction, Premature Ejaculation & Hormone Therapy

The office's primary treatment, called intracavernous pharmacotherapy (ICP), consists of administering an injection of a vasodilator drug by inserting a hypodermic needle directly into the penis, which increases blood flow, and causes an erection in minutes in many patients.

ICP treatment has been used to help create and maintain erections in patients who do not respond to more mainstream medications or are prohibited from taking these drugs because of a heart condition, diabetes or blood pressure since ICP treatments are localized and do not typically interact with other systemic medications.

Intracavernous pharmacotherapy can be used in patients with a wide variety of ailments wherein other medications might not be as effective. For example, a study showed that over seventy percent of patients with a spinal cord injury responded positively to intracavernous pharmacotherapy and were able to achieve an erection.

In addition to ICP, Boston Medical Group also offers treatments in hormone replacement therapy (HRT), specifically for low testosterone (Low T), a sublingual form of the well-known drug Viagra which is dissolved under the tongue and quickly enters the blood stream and a variety of treatment programs designed to specifically address low libido, ED, and premature ejaculation.

Notable Physicians

Many of the physicians employed by Boston Medical Group themselves have won individual awards, including the Marie and Oscar Randolph award, the KCMS Robert H. Hume award for excellence in surgical research and the Physician's Recognition Award for Continuing Medical Education by the American Medical Association, among others. These awards were not won during their employment at Boston Medical Group.

Advertising

The company's marketing campaign, produced by Boston Men's Health Center Inc., (the management and marketing company of which Boston Medical Group is a client) has included billboards, newspaper ads, radio commercials, and TV advertisements and often utilize the "Sex for Life"  Also, the company ran a radio campaign between 2007 and 2009 featuring a character named "Andrew" In his signature, common-man style, he recounts his previous battle with erectile dysfunction and premature ejaculation before visiting Boston Medical Group and touts the group as a viable alternative. Currently, the company is running a radio campaign featuring the voice of Peter Scolari.

Coverage in Media

On April 7, 2011 the Los Angeles Times published an exposé about Boston Male Medical Group's sales and compensation practices.  The article was titled "Clinic settles lawsuits but still faces scrutiny over erectile dysfunction injections" and subtitled "Boston Medical Group doctors get bonuses to promote the drug injections. Some patients say they suffered from priapism and permanent damage because they were not informed of the risks."

Legal Cases

After admitting to not keeping proper records in 2001 and 2002, one doctor at an office location in Manhattan was placed on probation for five years by the New York state Health Department, and was no longer allowed to treat patients with erectile dysfunction, premature ejaculation and other sexual problems.

John Henry Howard v. Boston Medical Group trial of September 2009 was successfully appealed in favor of Boston Medical Group and decided on July 12, 2011 by the Georgia Court of Appeals noting that proper instruction was ignored by the patient and that Boston Medical Group acted correctly to ensure proper patient care.

Boston Men's Health Center Inc. which responsible for advertising and marketing of Boston Medical Group was incorrectly named in this lawsuit in the State of Georgia as is also pointed out by the Georgia Court of Appeals. Boston Men's Health Center operates as a management company for the network of individual clinics and collects a management fee from their client, Boston Medical Group, for their management services.

References

External links
 Boston Medical Group website

Companies based in Costa Mesa, California
Urology organizations
1998 establishments in the United States